Pinkas or Pinchas may refer to:

 Pinkas (surname), a Jewish surname
 Pinkas Braun (1923–2008), Swiss actor
 Pinchas Zukerman (born 1948), Israeli-American violinist, violist and conductor
 Pinchas Menachem Justman (1848–1920), Hasidic rabbi and publisher of the Jerusalem Talmud
 Pinkas Synagogue, Prague, Czech Republic
 Pinkas haKehilot, volume of a book series on Eastern European countries' Jewish communities

See also
 
 Pinka, a river in Central Europe
 Pinka, Greater Poland Voivodeship
 Phinehas (disambiguation)